Nicholas Clarevaux was one of two Member of Parliament for the constituency of York along with John le Espicer in the first Parliament of 1297.

Life and politics

Nicholas was the son of Robert de Clarevaux, and his mother Eva was the daughter of William Fairfax, a Bailiff of the city of York. His brother Simon was rector of Bulmer. He was elected to Parliament in 1297 on 25 May.

References

Politicians from York
Members of the Parliament of England for constituencies in Yorkshire
14th-century births
Year of death unknown